Karoline Sørensen (born 19 February 2002) is a Danish swimmer. She competed in the mixed 4 × 100 metre medley relay at the 2020 Summer Olympics.

References

External links
 

2002 births
Living people
Danish female swimmers
Olympic swimmers of Denmark
Swimmers at the 2020 Summer Olympics
Place of birth missing (living people)